The Schwingbach  is a small  left tributary to the Kleebach river in central Hesse, Germany. It flows into the Kleebach in Hüttenberg.

See also
List of rivers of Hesse

References

Rivers of Hesse
Rivers of the Taunus
Rivers of Germany